Adolfo Bassi (Naples, 1775 – Trieste, 1855) was an Italian composer and operatic tenor. Brother of the bass Nicola Bassi and the contralto Carolina Bassi-Manna, he was also an impresario of the Teatro Nuovo in Trieste.

Operas
Il Riccardo o Il finto cieco e sordo (1809, Teatro Nuovo, Trieste)
L'ingiusta critica alle donne (1809, Teatro Nuovo, Trieste)
La covacenere (1817, Teatro Nuovo, Trieste)
I tre gobbi (1820, Teatro Grande, Trieste)

References

Italian tenors
Italian opera composers
Male opera composers
Italian male classical composers
Italian classical composers
1775 births
1855 deaths
Italian operatic tenors
Musicians from Naples
19th-century Italian male opera singers